Darren Jackson is a Scottish footballer.

Darren Jackson may also refer to:

Darren Jackson (Australian footballer) (born 1961), former Australian rules footballer
Darren Jackson (politician) (born 1970), member of the North Carolina House of Representatives
Darren Jackson (footballer born 1971) on List of foreign Veikkausliiga players
Darren Jackson (musician) from Kid Dakota
Darren R. Jackson (born 1964), chief executive officer of Advance Auto Parts Inc.